Jerónimo Venero Leyva (1561 – August 1628) was a Roman Catholic prelate who served as Archbishop of Monreale (1620–1628).

Biography
Jerónimo Venero Leyva was born in Valladolid, Spain in 1561.
On 17 February 1620, he was appointed during the papacy of Pope Paul V as Archbishop of Monreale.
On 23 February 1620, he was consecrated bishop by Giovanni Garzia Mellini, Cardinal-Priest of Santi Quattro Coronati, with Paolo De Curtis, Bishop Emeritus of Isernia, and Antonio de Franchis, Bishop of Andria, serving as co-consecrators. 
He served as Archbishop of Monreale until his death in August 1628.

References

External links and additional sources
 (for Chronology of Bishops) 
 (for Chronology of Bishops)  

17th-century Roman Catholic bishops in Sicily
Bishops appointed by Pope Paul V
1561 births
1628 deaths